Devachandra was a Jain scholar who lived in 19th century AD and wrote Rajavali-Katha.

Works
Devachandra composed Rajavali-Katha which mentions Mauryan rulers and their reigns.

Citations

Sources
 
 
 

19th-century Indian Jain writers